Sue Crawford (born January 10, 1967) née Sue Steinhauser, is a politician from the U.S. state of Nebraska.   She represents District 45, which includes the city of Bellevue and Offutt Air Force Base, in the Nebraska Legislature.

Education
Crawford received her BS in political science from Truman State University in 1989. In 1995, she completed her PhD from Indiana University Bloomington in the fields of American government and public policy, with a concentration in public management. While at IU, Crawford worked closely and co-published with Elinor Ostrom, a Nobel Prize winner in economics.

Elections
Crawford was first elected to represent Nebraska's 45th District in 2012. Crawford placed second in the May 15, 2012, non-partisan primary election, receiving 48.34% of the vote. On November 6, 2012, Crawford won the general election with 51.38% of the vote. She was sworn in on January 9, 2013.

References

External links
Official page at the Nebraska Legislature
 

1967 births
Living people
Indiana University Bloomington alumni
Democratic Party Nebraska state senators
People from Maryville, Missouri
People from Bellevue, Nebraska
Truman State University alumni
Women state legislators in Nebraska
21st-century American politicians
21st-century American women politicians